Pedro Jorge Rigato Delissetche, better known by his stage names George Rigaud, Georges Rigaud or Jorge Rigaud (11 August 1905 – 17 January 1984), was an Argentine film actor who appeared in 194 films between 1932 and 1981. 

Born in Buenos Aires, he went to live in France with his parents. He started his career in French films, using the name Georges Rigaud. The 1933 film Bastille Day, in which he shared the lead with Annabella, made him a promising actor in French cinema. Rigaud starred in various European films during the 1930s. In 1941, he returned to Argentine where he resumed his film career. In 1956, he returned to Europe and eventually settled in Spain. He went on to appear in Spanish, Italian and French films. Rigaud was killed in a road accident in Madrid.

Selected filmography

 Fantômas (1932)
 Beauty Spot (1932)
 Under the Leather Helmet (1932)
 The Regiment's Champion (1932)
 Bastille Day (1933)
 Idylle au Caire (1933)
 A Love Story (1933)
 Divine (1935)
 Nitchevo (1936)
 Parisian Life (1936)
 Nuits de feu (1937)
 Sarati the Terrible (1937)
 Wells in Flames (1937)
 There's No Tomorrow (1939)
 Abandonment (1940)
 Paris Underground (1945)
 I Walk Alone (1948)
 The Trap (1949)
 Native Son (1951)
 They Fired with Their Lives (1951)
 Mi calle (1960)
 The Colossus of Rhodes (1961)
 The Happy Thieves (1961) as Spanish Police Inspector
 The Secret of the Black Widow (1963)
 The Black Tulip (1964)
 Brandy (1964)
 That Man in Istanbul (1965)
 The Hell of Manitoba (1965)
 Black Box Affair (1966)
 Special Code: Assignment Lost Formula (1966)
 Savage Pampas (1966)
 Honeymoon, Italian Style (1966)
 Grand Slam (1967)
 It's Your Move (1968)
 Guns of the Magnificent Seven (1969)
  One on Top of the Other (1969)
 Marta (1971)
 A Lizard in a Woman's Skin (1971)
 Death Walks on High Heels (1971)
 Horror Express (1972)
 All the Colors of the Dark (1972)
 Knife of Ice (1972)
 His Name Was Holy Ghost (1972)
 The Case of the Bloody Iris (1972)
 Eyeball (1975)
 Maravillas (1981)

References

External links

1905 births
1984 deaths
20th-century Argentine male actors
Road incident deaths in Spain
Argentine male film actors
Male actors from Buenos Aires
Male Spaghetti Western actors